Annie Payson Call (1853–1940) was a Waltham author. She wrote several books and published articles in Ladies' Home Journal. Many articles are reprinted in her book Nerves and Common Sense.

The common theme of her work is mental health.

Works
Source: New General Catalog of Old Books and Authors
Regeneration Of The Body (1888)
As A Matter Of Course (1894)
The Freedom Of Life (1905) 
Man Of The World (1905)
Every Day Living (1906)
How To Live Quietly (1914)
Power Through Repose (1891) 
Nerves And Common Sense (1909) 
Brain Power For Business Men (1911)
Nerves And The War (1918)

Texts online

How To Live Quietly, available freely at Spiritual Freedom Library

Notes

External links
 
 
 
More information about some works at Spiritual Freedom Library

1853 births
1940 deaths
19th-century American women writers
19th-century American writers
20th-century American women writers
20th-century American non-fiction writers
American women non-fiction writers